Prostitution in Haiti, although illegal, continues to be a widespread problem for the country, particularly in the form of street prostitution (notably in the Pétion-Ville area of Port-au-Prince), as well as in bars, hotels and brothels. UNAIDS estimate there to be 70,000 prostitutes in the country. Law enforcement is generally lax.

The country used to be a premier destination in the 1970s for sex tourism for adults, including gay men. Sex tourism declined because of HIV fears but has returned, including child sex tourism.

Haiti suffers from extreme poverty, with much of the population living on less than a dollar a day; those with no other resources often turn to prostitution. 

After the 2010 earthquake, many prostitutes from the Dominican Republic crossed over the border, searching out clients amongst the aid workers and UN personal. Dominican women command a premium because of their lighter skin.

Allegations of sexual misconduct by UN and Oxfam staff

UN Peacekeeping Mission
Several hundred Sri Lankan troops, part of the UN mission, were expelled from the country in 2007. They were involved in trafficking Haitian girls to Sri Lanka and also being involved in child prostitution locally.

It was reported in 2010 that trafficked Dominican women had been found in brothels allegedly frequented by UN personnel.

In 2015 the UN reported that between 2008 and 2014, members of its peacekeeping mission had sexually abused more than 225 Haitian women in exchange for food, medication, and other items.

The UN has a zero-tolerance policy towards its personnel visiting the local sex trade, but this is virtually unenforceable.

As in other countries with a strong UN (or, for the case, other international organizations) presence, the combination of factors (local population in conditions of extreme poverty and the presence of foreign, well paid personnel, most of them away from their families) favor prostitution.

Oxfam
In February 2018 an investigation by The Times newspaper found that Oxfam allowed three men to resign and sacked four for gross misconduct after an inquiry concerning sexual exploitation, the downloading of pornography, bullying and intimidation. A confidential report produced by Oxfam in 2011 found that there had been “a culture of impunity” among some staff in Haiti and concluded that 'it cannot be ruled out that any of the prostitutes were under-aged'. Among the staff who were permitted to resign was the charity's Belgian country director, Roland Van Hauwermeiren. According to the internal report, Van Hauwermeiren admitted using prostitutes at a villa whose rent was paid for by Oxfam with charitable funds. Oxfam's chief executive at the time, Dame Barbara Stocking, offered Hauwermeiren “a phased and dignified exit” because of concern that sacking him risked “potentially serious implications” for the charity's work and reputation.

Oxfam did not report any of the incidents to the Haitian authorities, on the grounds that “it was extremely unlikely that any action would be taken”. Although Oxfam disclosed details of the incident to the Charity Commission, following the investigation by The Times the Commission revealed that it had never received the final investigation report and Oxfam “did not detail the precise allegations, nor did it make any indication of potential sexual crimes involving minors”. In light of the information revealed by The Times, a spokesperson for the Commission commented that: "We will expect the charity to provide us with assurance that it has learnt lessons from past incidents".

In response to the revelations, Liz Truss, the chief secretary to the Treasury, described the reports as “shocking, sickening and depressing”. Following the publication of the Times''' report, Oxfam issued a statement in which it asserted "Oxfam treats any allegation of misconduct extremely seriously. As soon as we became aware of a range of allegations — including of sexual misconduct — in Haiti in 2011 we launched an internal investigation. The investigation was announced publicly and staff members were suspended pending the outcome.” The statement also added that the allegations “that under-age girls may have been involved were not proven”.  Speaking on the BBC's Andrew Marr Show'', the international development secretary, Penny Mordaunt, said Oxfam had failed in its "moral leadership" over the "scandal". Mordaunt also said that Oxfam did "absolutely the wrong thing" by not reporting the detail of the allegations to the government.

HIV
Haiti has the highest cases of HIV/AIDS in the Caribbean region estimated to be at about a 1.8 percent prevalence as of 2013. An analysis of the causes of death, which started when hospital death certificates began to be collected in 1997, shows that AIDS was the leading cause of death in the country, but as of 2010, this has been reduced to only a 1 percent cause of death, as disaster-related issues has been the leading cause at 66 percent.

Sex trafficking

According to the US Department of State, Haiti is a source, transit and destination country for human trafficking. Women and children, particularly from Venezuela and the Dominican Republic are trafficked into the country for Forced prostitution.

Penalties for those convicted of human trafficking are jail sentences from 7 to 15 years plus hefty fines. If there are aggravating factors, such as trafficking minors, the sentence may be interlaced to life imprisonment. Similar sentences may be imposed on those obtaining, or attempting to obtain, sexual services from a victim of trafficking.

The United States Department of State Office to Monitor and Combat Trafficking in Persons ranks Haiti as a 'Tier 2 Watch List' country.

See also
Prostitution in the Dominican Republic

References